Day in Court was an American dramatized court show that ran on ABC Daytime starting on October 13, 1958 until its cancellation in February 1965.

Background and Overview

In the summer of 1957, ABC owned-and-operated Los Angeles affiliate KABC began broadcasting a show entitled Traffic Court. The series presented re-enactments of traffic court cases and arraignments. First the series aired locally but became part of ABC's national daytime schedule. It was soon followed by Divorce Court which premiered on, then, local Los Angeles independent station KTTV, (now a Fox owned-and-operated television station), in 1957. The show became nationally syndicated in 1958.

Day in Court premiered on October 13, 1958 as part of ABC's daytime schedule. The program aired five days a week in the afternoon. The program provided viewers with as realistic a look as possible at how real trials are conducted and decided. Re-enactments of actual cases were used, with real attorneys making their arguments in front of real judges. Only the defendants and witnesses were actors.

Edgar Allan Jones, Jr. and William Gwinn played the judge on alternating days. Jones had a law degree from the University of Virginia, was a member of the UCLA law faculty and a labor arbitrator. Gwinn was an actor.

Jones quits

By 1964, Day in Court was daytime TV's top-ranked program, with 20 million viewers. But when it slipped to second behind the daytime soap General Hospital, ABC decided to turn its courtroom hit into a soap opera. Jones quit in October 1964, and the series was cancelled four months later in February 1965.

Spin-offs

Day in Court had two spin-offs. They were Accused, (which Jones also presided over), and Morning Court. Accused aired during the 1958-59 television season. Morning Court aired during the 1960-61 television season. Both shows aired on ABC.

Casting

Similar to other courtroom dramas of the time, the defendants and witnesses were actors. However, the defense and prosecution attorneys were real-life lawyers.

 Edgar Allan Jones, Jr (January 8, 1921 in New York City, NY – May 10, 2013 in Santa Monica, CA) as the judge, (Mondays, Wednesdays, and Fridays)
 William Gwinn as the judge, (Tuesdays and Thursdays)

Bill Gwinn became a household name in the 1950s when they hosted the first audience participation shows "What's the Name of that Song?" He left Hollywood during the early 1970s and started the real estate business. After moving his wife Dorthea, two boys William and Michael from Beverly Hills to Laguna Beach, enjoyed a good living selling houses as well as a few TV commercials on the side. He died in the fall of 2002.

References

External links

1950s American drama television series
1960s American drama television series
1958 American television series debuts
1965 American television series endings
American Broadcasting Company original programming
Black-and-white American television shows
Dramatized court shows